Taurus Two, Taurus 2, Taurus II, or variation, may refer to:

 "Taurus 2" (song), a 1982 song by Mike Oldfield off the album Five Miles Out
 Moog Taurus II, a music synthesizer
 Bristol Taurus II, a radial aircraft engine
 Ford Taurus generation two, a passenger sedan car
 Taurus II rocket, a rocket in the Taurus series, later renamed to the Antares rocket

See also

 Taurus (disambiguation)